Gibberula aurata is a species of sea snail, a marine gastropod mollusk, in the family Cystiscidae.

References

 Gofas, S.; Afonso, J.P.; Brandào, M. (Ed.). (S.a.). Conchas e Moluscos de Angola = Coquillages et Mollusques d'Angola. [Shells and molluscs of Angola]. Universidade Agostinho / Elf Aquitaine Angola: Angola. 140 pp.
 Gofas, S. (1989). The Marginellidae of Angola: The genus Gibberula. Journal of Conchology. 33(3): 109-139.

External links
 Dautzenberg P. (1912) Mission Gruvel sur la côte occidentale d'Afrique (1909-1910): Mollusques marins. Annales de l'Institut Océanographique, Paris, (Nouvelle Série) 5(3): 1-111, pl. 1-3.

aurata
Gastropods described in 1913